Count Heinrich Carl Wilhelm Vitzthum von Eckstädt (26 March 1770, Dresden - 11 October 1837, Dresden) was a Saxon Privy Councilor, who served as General Director of the Dresden Academy of Fine Arts, and the Staatskapelle Dresden.

Biography 

Like most of his relatives, he embarked on an administrative career, in service to the House of Wettin, and was initially a private financial counselor at the Dresden Court. In 1815, he was appointed the Royal Saxon Court Marshal. In those positions, he is primarily known for the vigorous support he gave to the composer, Carl Maria von Weber who, at his urging, was named Kapellmeister in 1816.

He also served as Director of the Dresden Academy of Fine Arts, and the Hochschule für Grafik und Buchkunst Leipzig, until shortly before his death.

They had eight children, only four of whom survived infancy.

References

External links 
 Entry in the Deutschen Digitalen Bibliothek (DDB) 

1770 births
1837 deaths
Counts of Germany
Saxon nobility
Dresden Academy of Fine Arts
Hochschule für Grafik und Buchkunst Leipzig
People from Dresden